Eulima grimaldii is a species of sea snail, a marine gastropod mollusk in the family Eulimidae. The species is one of a number within the genus Eulima.

Description
The length of the shell attains 6 mm.

Distribution
This species was found in the Mediterranean Sea off Monaco.

References

External links
 Bouchet, P. & Warén, A. (1986). Revision of the Northeast Atlantic bathyal and abyssal Aclididae Eulimidae, Epitonidae (Mollusca, Gastropoda). Bollettino Malacologico. suppl. 2: 297-576.

grimaldii
Gastropods described in 1986